Lucas Leonel Palma (born 5 May 2003) is an Argentine footballer currently playing as a forward for Boca Juniors.

Career statistics

Club

References

2003 births
Living people
Sportspeople from Tucumán Province
Argentine footballers
Association football forwards
Argentine Primera División players
Boca Juniors footballers